A cross-cultural researcher is a type of ethnologist interested in discovering general patterns about cultural traits.  This branch of anthropology investigates what is universal and variable among cultures, why traits vary, and what consequences come from the variations.

Cross-cultural researchers generally follow cross-cultural research theory, which holds that most cultures share common evolutionary and functional traits. This view has evolved from the notion of cultures progressing from "barbarism to civilization" and "primitive versus advanced races" to a more nuanced,  comparative view. This evolution also seeks to de-emphasize various traditional approaches based on race and racism, to a more objective, neutral view of cultures, taking in all their diversity and variability.

See also 

 Anthropology
 Cross-cultural studies
 Human evolution
 Origin of the Nilotic peoples

Ethnology